KKTK (1400 AM, "Fox Sports 97.1 FM & 1400 AM") is an American radio station broadcasting a sports format. Licensed to Texarkana, Texas, United States, it serves the Texarkana metropolitan area.  The station, established in 1946, is currently owned by American Media Investments, Inc.

The station was reassigned the KKTK call sign by the Federal Communications Commission on February 7, 2007.

References

External links
FCC History Cards for KKTK

KTK
Radio stations established in 1946
Sports radio stations in the United States
1946 establishments in Texas